Kalitino is a rural locality (a village) in Pokrovskoye Rural Settlement, Vashkinsky District, Vologda Oblast, Russia. The population was 18 as of 2002.

Geography 
Kalitino is located 71 km northwest of Lipin Bor (the district's administrative centre) by road. Dryabloye is the nearest rural locality.

References 

Rural localities in Vashkinsky District